Woman Haters is a 1934 musical short subject directed by Archie Gottler starring American slapstick comedy team The Three Stooges (Moe Howard, Larry Fine, and Jerry Howard). It is the inaugural entry in the series released by Columbia Pictures starring the comedians, who would ultimately star in 190 short subjects for the studio between 1934 and 1959. This short is known to be the first program shown on Antenna TV, a channel that was launched on January 1, 2011, by Tribune Broadcasting (later bought by Nexstar Media Group).

Plot
The Stooges, employed as traveling salesmen, join the Woman Haters Club, swearing to never get romantically involved with any women. That does not last very long. Jim (Larry) finds an attractive woman, Mary (Marjorie White), falls in love, and has proposed marriage. Women Haters Tom (Moe) and Jack (Curly) talk him out of it. However, during the party, Mary's intimidating father threatens Jim to marry his daughter by telling him a story about his other daughter having a fiancé who tried to abandon her on their wedding day. His brothers and he had roughed him up for it, but also forced him to go through with the ceremony. Jim is convinced to go through the ceremony, much to the man's dismay. Later, on a train ride, the confrontation escalates between the Stooges and Mary.

Mary uses her feminine charm to woo both Jack and Tom in an attempt to make Jim jealous. She sings a theme ("my life, my love, my all") with each of the Stooges in turn, as she flirts with them. Each is attracted to her charms as she proves the oath they swore as Women Haters was fraudulent (though Jack attempts to resist her). Finally, Mary tells Tom and Jack the truth, that Jim and she are married, and pushes her way into bed with the trio, knocking Tom and Jack out the train window in the process. The film closes as the Stooges, now older, finally reunite at the now almost empty Woman Haters clubhouse when Jim enters and declares he wants to rejoin.

Cast
 Moe Howard as Tom
 Larry Fine as Jim
 Curly Howard as Jackie (billed as Jerry Howard)
 Marjorie White as Mary
 Bud Jamison as Woman Hater's Club chairman
 Monte Collins as Mr. Zero
 Walter Brennan as train conductor
 Jack Norton as Justice of the Peace
 Fred "Snowflake" Toones as porter
 A. R. Haysel as Mary's father
 Dorothy Vernon as Mary's mother
 June Gittelson as Mary's overweight sister
 Jack "Tiny" Sandford as Mary's policeman uncle
 George Gray as Mary's brother-in-law on crutches

Production notes
The teaser shows the emblem of National Recovery Administration
Woman Haters was filmed over four days on March 27–30, 1934. It was the sixth entry in Columbia's "Musical Novelty" series, with all dialogue delivered in rhyme. Jazz Age-style music plays throughout the entire short, with the rhymes spoken in rhythm with the music. Being the sixth in a “Musical Novelties” short subject series, the movie appropriated its musical score from the first five films. The song “My Life, My Love, My All”, featured in this short, was originally “At Last!” from Umpa, a previous "Musical Novelty" entry. Other music cues used in other Columbia "Musical Novelty" shorts like School for Romance and Susie's Affairs.
Curly Howard was billed under his pre-Stooge name "Jerry Howard" in this short.
The Stooges had different names in this short: Curly is "Jackie", Moe is "Tom", and Larry is "Jim". This also marked one of the few Stooge shorts that features Larry as the lead character. Others include Three Loan Wolves and He Cooked His Goose.
Bud Jamison's character delivers the first "eye pokes" to the Stooges, as part of the initiation into the Woman Haters Club. He pokes Larry in the eyes first, followed by Curly. Finally, he delivers an eye poke to Moe, who mistakenly blames Curly and promptly slaps him, igniting the first real Stooge brawl of the short films.
This short includes a young Walter Brennan playing the train conductor being initiated into the Woman Haters Club by Moe and Curly.)
In contrast to later Stooge films, Larry and Curly are more willful and defiant to Moe, even giving him some slapstick vengeance of their own, rather than being mere subordinates.
Curly delivers his first "woob-woob-woob-woob!" and "Nyuk, nyuk, nyuk" in this short, although the latter is not quite delivered in the eventual "classic" style.
Curly spends most of this short wearing pants that are split in the back.
This was Marjorie White's final film role, who died in a car accident in 1935.

References

External links
 
Woman Haters at threestooges.net

1934 films
The Three Stooges films
American black-and-white films
1934 comedy films
Fiction about rail transport
Rail transport films
Films scored by Louis Silvers
Columbia Pictures short films
American slapstick comedy films
1930s English-language films
1930s American films